Christian Munk (born August 5, 1967) is an American retired professional basketball player. He was a 6'9" (198 cm) 225 lb (102 kg) power forward. He attended and played for Archbishop Riordan High School in San Francisco and played collegiately at the University of Southern California (USC). Born in San Francisco, California, he played for the Utah Jazz in the National Basketball Association (NBA).

Munk also played 22 games for the Brisbane Bullets of the Australian National Basketball League (NBL) in 1995.

Notes

External links
NBA stats @ basketballreference.com
Chris Munk NBL profile @ nblstats.com

1967 births
Living people
American expatriate basketball people in Australia
American men's basketball players
Basketball players from San Francisco
Brisbane Bullets players
Parade High School All-Americans (boys' basketball)
Power forwards (basketball)
Rapid City Thrillers players
Rockford Lightning players
Small forwards
Undrafted National Basketball Association players
USC Trojans men's basketball players
Utah Jazz players
Wichita Falls Texans players